The Revenue Men is a British television series, produced and transmitted by the BBC between 1967 and 1968.

The series dealt with cases handled by the Investigation Branch of Customs and Excise such as the illegal import of goods, illegal immigration and business transactions amongst travellers.

The Revenue Men was produced by Gerard Glaister. The series lasted for three series and 39 episodes in total. In spite of this fact, all of the episodes were later wiped, with no episodes extant in the BBC archives as of 2009.

External links

BBC television dramas
Lost BBC episodes
1960s British drama television series
1967 British television series debuts
1968 British television series endings
1960s British crime television series
English-language television shows